Hypokremnos was a town of ancient Ionia.

Its site is located near the modern Gülbahce, Asian Turkey.

References

Populated places in ancient Ionia
Former populated places in Turkey